The Weird and Wonderful Marmozets is the debut studio album by the English alternative rock band Marmozets. It was released by Roadrunner Records on 29 September 2014. The album was very well received by music critics, receiving a 9/10 score from Metal Hammer upon release, and winning the Kerrang! Award for Best Album in 2015. In July 2016, Metal Hammer placed the album 70th in their list of the 100 Greatest Albums of the 21st Century so far.

Track listing

Credits 
Writing, performance and production credits are adapted from the album liner notes.

Personnel 
Marmozets
 Becca Macintyre – vocals
 Sam Macintyre – guitar, vocals
 Jack Bottomley – guitar
 Will Bottomley – bass, vocals
 Josh Macintyre – drums

Additional musicians
 Larry Hibbitt – percussion, keyboard
 Sem Schaap - Piano

Production
 Larry Hibbitt – production
 James Mottershead – engineering
 Tom Woodstock – editing
 Corey Moore – assistant tracking engineer
 Michael H. Brauer – mixing
 Mark Bengston – mix assistant, Pro Tools engineering
 D. Sardy – mixing of "Why Do You Hate Me?"
 Ryan Castle – mix engineering
 Cameron Barton – engineering
 Joe LaPorta – mastering

Artwork and design
 Hayes Hopkinson – artwork
 Tom Barnes – photography
 Briggs Design – layout

Studios 
 Chairworks, West Yorkshire, UK – tracking
 Artspace Studio, London, UK – tracking of "Move, Shake, Hide"
 Xylo Sound, London, UK – recording of vocals, overdubs
 Electric Lady Studios, New York City, NY, USA – mixing
 Hillside Manor – mixing of "Why Do You Hate Me?"
 Sterling Sound, NY, USA – mastering

Charts

References

External links 
 
  The Weird and Wonderful Marmozets at Roadrunner Records

2014 debut albums
Marmozets albums
Roadrunner Records albums